Briel  may refer to:

 Briel (parish), a parish in the municipality of Buggenhout and the sub-municipality of Baasrode in the town Dendermonde in Flanders
 Brielle, a town in the Netherlands